is a Japanese crime and science fiction author. He has won the Nihon SF Taisho Award, the Seiun Award three times, and an award for mystery fiction. His first story was published in 1974. His novel Aphrodite was translated into English in 2004. He also wrote After the Long Goodbye, a Ghost in the Shell-related novel.

Works in English translation
Novels
Aphrodite (Kurodahan Press, 2004)
Ghost in the Shell 2: Innocence: After the Long Goodbye (Viz Media, 2005 , 2007 )

Short stories
 "The Import of Tremors" (Lairs of the Hidden Gods, Volume 1: Night Voices, Night Journeys, Kurodahan Press, 2005)
 "Silver Bullet" (Speculative Japan 3, Kurodahan Press, 2012)

References

External links
J'Lit | Authors : Masaki Yamada | Books from Japan 

The Encyclopedia of Science Fiction page 641
 Yamada Masaki on KURODAHAN PRESS

1950 births
Living people
Japanese science fiction writers
Japanese mystery writers
Mystery Writers of Japan Award winners
Honkaku Mystery Award winners
People from Nagoya